The Greece–Bulgaria Territorial Co-operation Programme is a European cooperation Programme according to the European Cohesion Policy 2007–2013.

Eligible Area 
The Programme eligible areas are the following:

•	Areas in Greece: regions of Evros, Xanthi, Rhodope, Drama, Kavala, Thessaloniki and Serres;

•	Areas in Bulgaria: regions of Blagoevgrad, Smolyan, Kardzhali and Haskovo.

Aim and purpose of the Programme 
The Programme aims to promote cross-border cooperation in the eligible area by ensuring regional cohesion and enhancing competitiveness to boost the development of the region and  transform it into a centre for sustainable development.

Priorities and Measures 
The Programme Priorities for action are:

• Priority Axis  1: Quality of Life – The main aim under this priority is to upgrade and manage environmental and cultural resources, health and social aspects to improve the quality of life in the cross-border area.

• Priority Axis 2: Accessibility – The main aim under this priority is to improve transport and communication networks and ensure easy and safe circulation of goods, services and people in the cross-border area;

• Priority Axis 3: Competitiveness and Human Resources – The main aim under this priority is to stimulate entrepreneurship, invest in human capital and promote research and innovation to increase competitiveness and improve the economic and social development of the cross-border area.

• Priority Axis 4: Technical Assistance – This priority aims at supporting the overall management and implementation of the Programme.

Funding 
The total budget of the Programme is about €130 million, with European Community assistance through the European Regional Development Fund (ERDF) amounting to some €111 million.

The initial allocation per Priority Axis foreseen at this stage is the following:

•	46% for Priority Axis 1

•	24% for Priority Axis 2

•	24% for Priority Axis 3

•	6%  for Priority Axis 4

Programme Management and Authorities 
The common cooperation organs for the implementation of the Programme are:

•	Managing Authority(MA): it is responsible for managing and implementing the Programme in accordance with the Programme and European Regulations. The Managing Authority of the Programme is the Greek Ministry of Economy and Finance;

•	Bulgarian National Authority: it supports the activity of the MA in implementing the programme on the Bulgarian side;

•	Certifying Authority: it is responsible for correct certification of the expenses incurred by beneficiaries and payment authorizations in accordance with the Programme and European Regulations;

•	Audit Authority: it is responsible for the functioning of the management and control systems in accordance with the Programme and European Regulations.

References

External links
 Bulgary - Ministry of Regional Development and Public Works
 The Official Web Portal of the Diplomatic Missions of Bulgaria Abroad
 EU STRUCTURAL FUNDS – Single Information Web Portal
 Hellenic Republic –Ministry for Development, Competitiveness and Shipping Website

Bulgaria–Greece relations